Alice Garcia Reyes (born October 14, 1942) is a Filipina dancer, choreographer, teacher, director and producer. The founder (together with Eddie Elejar) of Ballet Philippines, she received since June 20, 2014 from the Philippine President Benigno Aquino III the highest award in the Arts, National Artist of the Philippines. She was chiefly responsible in popularizing contemporary dance with the Alice Reyes Dance Company which  
staged the first modern dance concert at the Cultural Center of the Philippines Main Theater in February 1970. It was this company that later became Ballet Philippines. She is best known for "Bungkos Suite", "Carmen", "Carmina Burana", "Romeo and Juliet", "Rama Hari", "Cinderella", "Amada", "Itim-Asu", and "Tales of the Manuvu"—all nuanced with Filipino culture, gesture and grace.

Early life and education
Reyes was born on October 14, 1942. At a very young age, Reyes took up lessons in classical ballet under Rosalia Merino while studying at Maryknoll College where she completed a Bachelor of Arts degree in History and Foreign Services.

Soon after, she took post-graduate studies at Ateneo de Manila University. She further trained under the guidance of Leonor Orosa Goquingco and Ricardo Casell of the Philippine Women's University (PWU).

In addition, she took up folk dance at the Bayanihan Philippine National Folk Dance Company. Thinking of deepening her professional studies, she went to America and enrolled in formal courses in modern dance and jazz.

In New York, she took the opportunity to take more formal studies at Sarah Lawrence College in Westchester County, New York.

First marriage and divorce
Reyes was once married to Dick Upton, the current treasurer of Ballet Philippines, but they got separated in 1982. Upton later came out as gay and married his partner Elmer.

Retirement
Reyes retired from Ballet Philippines in 1985 but still served as its artistic director until 1989. Her decision was motivated mainly by her desire to live with her second husband Ted Van Doorn and their family in California. She started using her married name, Alicia Van Doorn when credited for her artistic efforts during this time. She resumed using her maiden name after officially becoming a National Artist.

After Reyes left, Ballet Philippines went through a string of artistic directors, most notably Paul Alexander Morales, who served for more than 8 years, and Alan Hineline, a choreographer and dancer who was born in Franklin, Ohio but is now based in New York. Hineline also served as chief operating officer of Ballet Philippines, overseeing a complete rebranding of the organization.

Return to Ballet Philippines
In 2017, Reyes was brought back on as the artistic director of Ballet Philippines (BP), just in time for the company’s 50th year anniversary. Her permanent residence was still in the US so she flew in and out of the Philippines for her occupation as artistic director.

BP exit and controversy
On February 6, 2020 the board of trustees of BP concluded a months-long search for a new artistic director and decided to go with renowned Russian ballet dancer Mikhail "Misha" Martynyuk. He was favored by the BP board over a handful of other candidates, including two who were personally endorsed by Reyes herself. These were Adam Sage, an American who had danced with BP in the late 1970's and came back as associate artistic director in 2017, and Ronelson Yadao, a dancer and choreographer who was being groomed by Reyes as the next associate artistic director for Sage. The two were not able to make it on the day of their interviews with BP for the artistic director position because of prior commitments and were denied to reschedule.

Reyes learned of Martynyuk's appointment after the BP board issued a circular and shared Martynyuk's credentials on an internal bulletin board. At this time, Reyes wrote to the board, congratulating the search committee on their decision. She added that she was looking forward to meeting her successor.

As news of Martynyuk's appointment and Reyes's subsequent replacement came out, along with the notion that it caught her off guard, various individuals expressed disapproval online and called for the appointment to be revoked. Reyes insists that she does not personally use social media so all views related to the topic expressed online have only been relayed to her through other mediums.

Reyes is scheduled to officially step down from her post as artistic director on March 31, 2020. This is a month earlier than the expiration date of the contract that she originally signed when she returned to the role back in 2018.

Aftermath
Although Reyes had agreed to leave her artistic director post in April 2020 years prior, she has expressed disappointment at the turn of events that saw the introduction of a new artistic director before her departure.

Major works

 Amada (1969)
 At a Maranaw Gathering (1970)
 Itim-Asu (1971)
 Tales of the Manuvu (1977)
 Rama Hari (1980)
 Bayanihan Remembered (1987)

References

1942 births
Living people
National Artists of the Philippines
Filipino female dancers
Miriam College alumni
Ateneo de Manila University alumni